Dubravko Detoni (born 22 February 1937) is a composer, pianist and writer. Although active since the early 1970s he is almost unknown internationally.

He was born in Križevci, Croatia, educated in Zagreb, Sienna, Warsaw and Darmstadt, and studied with John Cage in Paris. He has written more than a hundred musical pieces, theatrical spectacles, multimedia and performance pieces, books of poetry, essays, commentaries, and radio and TV programs.

His son Danijel is a pianist.

As the founder and leader of the ensemble Acezantez, he has performed around Europe, Asia and North America.

In 2000, the Paradigm Discs record label released Dubravko Detoni a CD of pieces from 3 LPs that appeared on Jugoton (today's Croatia Records) in the mid 1970s.

References

External links
Information on Dubravko Detoni CD
Poetry by Dubravko Detoni
Contemporary Music in Croatia: Traditions and innovations, by William A Everett, in Central Europe Review, Vol 2, No 19, 15 May 2000

1937 births
Living people
People from Križevci
20th-century classical composers
Croatian composers
Academy of Music, University of Zagreb alumni
Vladimir Nazor Award winners
Male classical composers
20th-century male musicians